Dock Creek is a stream in the U.S. state of West Virginia.

Dock Creek was named in honor of Doctor Hampton, a pioneer settler.

See also
List of rivers of West Virginia

References

Rivers of Wayne County, West Virginia
Rivers of West Virginia